Nilesh Patel is a Canadian director and producer of films.

Early life

Patel was raised in Prince George, British Columbia and attended Duchess Park Secondary School, where he was first exposed to the Brocket 99 audio tape. He attended the city's College of New Caledonia and then obtained a degree in molecular biology from the University of Victoria. After working as a diabetes researcher in Boston and Montreal, Patel changed careers and started making films in the United Kingdom.

Filmmaking

Patel now resides in Vancouver, British Columbia, Canada and was a program co-ordinator for the National Film Board's Diversity Project, director for Flourish Media and teaches filmmaking to street youth.

Films
2005 - Brocket 99 - Rockin' the Country—Patel's first feature documentary about a popular underground audio tape parody of Canadian First Nations stereotypes.

References

Canadian documentary film directors
Canadian people of Indian descent
Living people
People from Prince George, British Columbia
University of Victoria alumni
Year of birth missing (living people)
Canadian Hindus
National Film Board of Canada people
Canadian documentary film producers
Film producers from British Columbia
Film directors from British Columbia